Dhives Akuru, later called Dhivehi Akuru (meaning Maldivian letters) is a script formerly used for the Maldivian language. The name can be alternatively spelled Dives Akuru or Divehi Akuru using the ISO 15919 Romanization scheme, as the "d" is unaspirated.

History
Dhives Akuru developed from Brahmi. The oldest attested inscription bears a clear resemblance to South Indian epigraphical records of the sixth-eighth centuries, written in local subtypes of the Brahmi script. The letters on later inscriptions are clearly of the cursive type, strongly reminding of the medieval scripts used in Sri Lanka and South India such as Sinhala, Grantha and Vatteluttu. There are also some elements from the Kannada-Telugu scripts visible. The form of this script attested in loamaafaanu (copper plates) of the 12th and 13th centuries and in inscriptions on coral stone dating back to the Buddhist period (~200 BC to 12th century AD) was called by Bell Evēla Akuru (meaning "script of yore":82-83; footnote 5 to distinguish it from the more recent form of the same script. The most recent form (starting from around the 14th century) was more calligraphic and the letter forms changed a little. Like other Brahmic scripts, Dhives Akuru descended ultimately from the Brahmi script and thus was written from left to right.

Dhives Akuru was still used in some southern atolls alongside with Thaana until the end of the 19th century. The last known official document from the southern atolls (in Dhives Akuru and Thaana) was written by Haajee Muhammad Kaleygefaanu in 1927. Since then its use has been limited to scholars and hobbyists. It can still be found on gravestones and some monuments, including the stone base of the pillars supporting the main structure of the ancient Friday mosque in Malé. Bell obtained an astrology book written in Dhives Akuru in Addu Atoll, in the south of the Maldives, during one of his trips. This book is now kept in the National Archives of Sri Lanka in Colombo.

Bodufenvalhuge Sidi, an eminent Maldivian scholar, wrote a book called Divehi Akuru in 1959, prompted by then Prime Minister Ibrahim Nasir.

Unicode

The Dhives Akuru script was added to Unicode version 13.0 in March 2020, with 72 characters located in the Dives Akuru block (U+11900–U+1195F):

References

Bell, H.C.P. Excerpta Maldiviana. Reprint 1922-1935 edn. New Delhi 1998.
Bell, H.C.P. The Maldive islands. Monograph on the History, Archaeology and Epigraphy. Reprint 1940 edn. Male' 1986.
Divehi Bahuge Qawaaaid. Vols 1 to 5. Ministry of Education. Male' 1978.
Divehīnge Tarika. Divehīnge Bas. Divehibahāi Tārikhah Khidumaiykurā Qaumī Majlis. Male’ 2000.
Geiger, Wilhelm. Maldivian Linguistic Studies. Reprint 1919 edn. Novelty Press. Male’ 1986.
Gunasena, Bandusekara. The Evolution of the Sinhalese Script. Godage Poth Mendura. Colombo 1999.
Romero-Frias, Xavier. The Maldive Islanders, A Study of the Popular Culture of an Ancient Ocean Kingdom. Barcelona 1999.
Sivaramamurti, C. Indian Epigraphy and South Indian Scripts. Bulletin of the Madras Government Museum. Chennai 1999.

Citations

See also
 Maldivian language
 Sinhala script
 Thaana script
 History of the Maldives

Maldivian scripts
Obsolete writing systems